Community Aid Relief and Development (CoAid) is a US-based Christian non-profit organization and is dedicated to the rebuilding of communities affected by poverty and natural disaster. CoAid assists with disaster relief, sustainable development, and training. The goal of CoAid is to demonstrate the love of Christ in practical ways that lift people out of poverty and hardship.

External links
 Official Website 
 Facebook page
 Twitter page

Religious charities based in the United States
Christian organizations based in the United States
Charities based in Colorado